Unilever Australasia is the Australian and New Zealand subsidiary company of British FMCG company Unilever. The 3 divisions of the company are Home & Personal Care, Foods (excluding Ice Cream) and Ice Cream. The company is headquartered in Epping, Sydney, Australia, and has factories located in North Rocks (Sydney, NSW, Australia), Minto (Sydney, NSW, Australia), Tatura (Melbourne, VIC, Australia) and Petone (Wellington, WGN, New Zealand). Most of the HPC and foods products sold are similar to those sold by Unilever in other Western countries, whilst the ice cream subsidiary company is Streets, which is the largest ice cream company in Australia.

References

Food and drink companies based in Sydney
Manufacturing companies based in Sydney
Unilever companies
Australian subsidiaries of foreign companies